Steven van Groningen (born 29 December 1957) is a Dutch rower. He competed in the men's quadruple sculls event at the 1984 Summer Olympics.

References

1957 births
Living people
Dutch male rowers
Olympic rowers of the Netherlands
Rowers at the 1984 Summer Olympics